The Sailor Moon manga series features an extensive cast of characters created by Naoko Takeuchi. Each Guardian undergoes a transformation which grants her a uniform in her 
own theme colors and a unique elemental power. The ten Sailor Guardians are named after the planets of the Solar System, with the exception of Earth but including its moon. While many of the characters are humans with superhuman strength and magical abilities, the cast also includes anthropomorphic animals and extraterrestrial lifeforms.

The series follows the adventures of the titular protagonist, Sailor Moon, her lover Tuxedo Mask, her cat advisor Luna, and her guardians and friends: Sailors Mercury, Mars, Jupiter, and Venus. They are later joined by Chibiusa (Sailor Moon and Tuxedo Mask's daughter from the future) and four more guardians: Sailors Uranus, Neptune, Pluto, and Saturn. The series' antagonists include the Dark Kingdom, the Black Moon Clan, the Death Busters, the Dead Moon Circus, and Shadow Galactica.

Takeuchi's initial concept was a story called Codename: Sailor V, in which Sailor V discovers her magical powers and protects the people of Earth. After the Codename: Sailor V manga was proposed for an anime adaptation, Takeuchi changed her concept to include ten superheroines who defend the galaxy. The manga's anime, live-action, musical, and video game adaptations feature some original characters created by the production staff and not by Takeuchi.

Creation and conception
Naoko Takeuchi initially wrote Codename: Sailor V, a one-shot manga which focused on Sailor Venus. When Sailor V was proposed for an anime adaptation by Toei Animation, Takeuchi changed the concept to include Sailor Venus as a part of a "sentai" (team of five) and created the characters of Sailors Moon, Mercury, Mars, and Jupiter.

The name "Sailor Senshi" comes from sailor fuku, a type of Japanese school uniform that the main characters' fighting uniforms are based on, and the Japanese word senshi, which can mean "soldier", "warrior", "guardian", or "fighter". Takeuchi created the term by fusing English and Japanese words. The DIC Entertainment/Cloverway English adaptation of the anime changed it to "Sailor Scout" for most of its run. According to Takeuchi, only females can be Sailor Guardians. In the anime's fifth season, the Sailor Starlights are depicted as men transforming into women when changing from their normal forms into Sailor Guardians, rather than just being women disguising as men as they appear in the manga.

Takeuchi wanted to create a series about girls in outer space, and her editor, Fumio Osano, suggested that Takeuchi add the "sailor suit" motif to the uniform worn by the Sailor Guardians. Takeuchi settled on a more unified appearance in later stages of character design. Among the protagonist Sailor Guardians, Sailor Venus (during her time as Sailor V) has the only outfit that varies significantly from the others. Sailor Moon, whatever form she takes, always has a more elaborate costume than any of the others. She also gains individual power-ups more frequently than any other character. Sailor Guardians originating from outside the Solar System have different and varying outfits; however, one single feature – the sailor collar – connects them all.

Most of the antagonists in the series have names that are related to minerals and gemstones, including Queen Beryl and the Four Kings of Heaven, the Black Moon Clan, Kaolinite and the Witches 5, and most of the members of the Dead Moon Circus. Members of the Amazoness Quartet are named after the first four asteroids to be discovered. The Sailor Animamates have the prefix "Sailor" (despite not being true Sailor Guardians in the manga), followed by the name of a metal and the name of an animal.

Main characters

Sailor Moon

 is the main protagonist of the series. Usagi is a careless fourteen-year-old girl with an enormous capacity for love, compassion, and understanding. Usagi transforms into the heroine called Sailor Moon, the Guardian of Love and Justice. At the beginning of the series, she is a self-described immature crybaby who resents fighting evil and wants nothing more than to be a normal girl. As the story progresses, however, she embraces the chance to use her power to protect those she cares about.

Tuxedo Mask

 is a student who is older than Usagi. When he was a young child, Mamoru was in a car accident that killed his parents and erased his memories. He and Usagi share a special psychic connection, and he can sense when she is in danger. This inspires him to take on the guise of Tuxedo Mask and fight alongside the Sailor Guardians when needed. After an initially confrontational relationship, he and Usagi remember their past lives together and fall in love again.

Sailor Mercury

 is a quiet but intelligent fourteen-year-old bookworm in Usagi's class with a rumored IQ of 300. She can transform into Sailor Mercury, the Guardian of Water and Wisdom. Ami's shy exterior masks a passion for learning and taking care of the people around her. She hopes to eventually become a doctor like her mother, and tends to be the practical one in the group. She is secretly a fan of pop culture and romance novels, and becomes embarrassed whenever this is pointed out. Ami also uses her handheld computer, which is capable of scanning and detecting virtually anything about which she requires information.

Sailor Mars

 is an elegant fourteen-year-old miko. Because of her work as a Shinto priestess, Rei has limited precognition and can dispel or nullify evil using special ofuda scrolls, even in her civilian form. She transforms into Sailor Mars, the Guardian of Fire and Passion. She is very serious and focused, and easily becomes annoyed by Usagi's laziness, although she cares about her very much. In the anime adaptation, Rei is portrayed as boy-crazy and short-tempered, while in the manga and live-action series she is depicted as uninterested in romance and more self-controlled. She attends a private Catholic school separate from the other girls.

Sailor Jupiter

 is a fourteen-year-old girl who is a student in Usagi Tsukino's class and was rumoured to have been expelled from her previous school for fighting. Unusually tall and strong for a Japanese schoolgirl, she transforms into Sailor Jupiter, the Guardian of Thunder and Courage. Both of Makoto's parents died in a plane crash years ago, so she lives alone and takes care of herself. She cultivates her physical strength and domestic interests, including housekeeping, cooking, and gardening. Makoto excels at hand-to-hand combat. Her dream is to marry a young handsome man and to own a flower-and-cake shop.

Sailor Venus

 is a fourteen-year-old perky dreamer. Minako first appears as the main protagonist of Codename: Sailor V. She has a companion cat called Artemis who works alongside Luna in guiding the Sailor Guardians. Minako transforms into Sailor Venus, the Guardian of Love and Beauty, and leads Sailor Moon's four inner Guardians, while acting as Sailor Moon's bodyguard and decoy because of their near-identical looks. She dreams of becoming a famous singer and idol, and attends auditions whenever she can. In contrast, in the live-action series, she is a successful J-pop singer (of whom Usagi, Ami, and Makoto are fans) and has poor health due to her anemia, choosing to isolate herself from the other Guardians as a result.

Sailor Chibi Moon

 is the future daughter of Neo-Queen Serenity and King Endymion in the 30th century. She later trains with Sailor Moon to become a Sailor Guardian in her own right, and learns to transform into Sailor Chibi Moon (or "Sailor Mini Moon" in the English series). At times she has an adversarial relationship with her mother in the 20th century, but as the series progresses they develop a deep bond. Chibiusa wants to grow up to become like her mother.

Sailor Pluto

 is a mysterious woman who appears first as Sailor Pluto, the Guardian of Spacetime and Change. She has the duty of guarding the Space-Time Door from unauthorized travelers. Only later does she appear on Earth, living as a college student. She has a distant personality and can be very stern, but can also be quite friendly and helps the Sailor Guardians when she can. After her long vigil guarding the Space-Time Door she carries a deep sense of loneliness, although she is close friends with Chibiusa, who calls her by her nickname "Puu". Sailor Pluto's talisman is her Garnet Rod, which aids her power to attack and temporarily stop time.

Sailor Uranus

 is a good-natured tomboyish girl who is a year older than most of the other Sailor Guardians. She is able to transform into Sailor Uranus, the Guardian of Sky and Flight. Before becoming a Sailor Guardian, she aspired to become a race car driver, and she has excellent driving skills. She tends to dress and, in the anime, speak like a man. In the show the characters often mistake her for a man. When fighting the enemy she distrusts outside help and prefers to work solely with her girlfriend, Sailor Neptune, and later Sailors Pluto and Saturn. Sailor Uranus's talisman, known as the Space Sword, aids her fighting.

Sailor Neptune

 is an elegant and talented violinist and painter. Similar to her partner and lover, Haruka Tenoh, she hails from a wealthy family, though they are not mentioned in the series. She is able to transform into Sailor Neptune, Guardian of Ocean and Embrace. She worked alone for some time before finding her partner, Sailor Uranus. Neptune ultimately gave up her own dreams and became fully devoted to her duty as a Sailor Guardian, and is willing to make any sacrifice for it. Sailor Neptune's talisman is her Deep Aqua Mirror, which aids her intuition and reveals cloaked evil.

Sailor Saturn

 is a sweet and lonely young girl. A laboratory accident in her youth significantly compromised her health. After overcoming the darkness that has surrounded her family, Hotaru is able to become Sailor Saturn, Guardian of Silence, Destruction, and Rebirth. She is often pensive, and as a human has the inexplicable power to heal others. Sailor Saturn's weapon is her Silence Glaive, which gives her the power to generate barriers and destroy a planet. When she uses that power, she kills herself but is reborn afterwards by Sailor Moon. Later she lived with Haruka, Michiru, and Setsuna like a family.

Antagonists

Dark Kingdom

The  are the first set of antagonists the Sailor Guardians encounter in the first arc of the manga and all its adaptions. Established by Queen Beryl, its members mostly consist of brainwashed reincarnations of residents from the fictional Golden Kingdom of Earth whose mission is to gather human energy and find the Silver Crystal in order to reawaken Queen Metaria, the evil entity responsible for the destruction of both the Silver Millennium of the Moon and the Golden Kingdom.

Hell Tree aliens
The  are an anime-only group of characters who serve as the main antagonists in the first thirteen episodes of Sailor Moon R. Ail and An wandered space for many years before reaching Earth, where they collect energy to revive the Hell Tree so that it can give them energy to survive. Unlike other antagonists of the series, their mission was primarily that of survival, not conquest or destruction.

Ail and An
While trying to blend in, Ail acts as An's brother. He develops a crush on Usagi, and constantly tries to win her over, much to An's dismay. He constantly denies these feelings to An, knowing her tendency to have fits of jealous rage. An develops a crush on Mamoru, and constantly tries to win him over, much to the dismay of Ail and Usagi. Ail and An are the only two of their kind.

Hikaru Midorikawa voiced Ail in the original series, and Yumi Tōma voiced An. In the DIC English version, Alan is voiced by Vince Corazza and Ann by Sabrina Grdevich. In the Viz Media English version, Ail is voiced by Brian Beacock and An by Dorothy Elias-Fahn.

The Hell Tree
The  is an alien tree that nourishes Ail and An. The tree lived alone on an island in a vast ocean on a faraway planet. The tree then created life and gave energy to its many children, until the children became greedy and fought each other until the planet was destroyed, with the tree and two small children, Ail and An, as the only survivors. The tree became weak and required energy to stay alive. Ail and An supply it with human energy to revive it but this stops working. The tree becomes angered and starts to injure those around it, killing An in the process. Sailor Moon uses her power to purify the Tree and resurrect Ann. Ali and An are left with a reborn tree in the form of a small sapling. The two of them leave Earth to live a better life with the Tree.

The Hell Tree was voiced in Japanese by Taeko Nakanishi. In the DIC English adaptation, the Doom Tree was voiced by Elizabeth Hanna. In the Viz Media English adaptation, she is voiced by Erin Fitzgerald.

Cardians
The  are monsters of the day used by Ail and An to obtain energy to revive the Hell Tree. The Cardians are kept in cards until they are summoned by Ail. To summon them, Ail would hold up several cards, and An would pick one. The card would then rise into the air and Ail would play a tune on his flute which causes the Cardian to come alive. When a Cardian is destroyed, it changes back into its card form and the picture of the Cardian on the card turns black.

Black Moon Clan

The  are the main antagonists in the "Black Moon" arc of the manga and its adaptations. Led by Prince Demand and based on planet Nemesis, which provides them with the Malefic Black Crystal, the Black Moon Clan are a terrorist group from the 30th century whose desire to end the reign of Neo-Queen Serenity is manipulated by the mysterious Wiseman.

Death Busters

The  are the main antagonists in the "Infinity" arc of the manga and its adaptions. Initially led by Kaolinite and Professor Souichi Tomoe before the resurrection of their true leader Mistress 9, the Death Busters consist of human-alien hybrids seeking to bring the alien creature Pharaoh 90 to terraform Earth.

Dead Moon Circus

The  are the main antagonists in the "Dream" arc of the manga and its adaptations. Led by Zirconia, members of the Dead Moon Circus seek for the Golden Crystal to release their ruler Queen Nehelenia from her mirror prison and take over the Earth.

Shadow Galactica

 are the main antagonists of the final arc of the manga and its adaptations. Shadow Galactica is an organization of corrupted Sailor Guardians led by Sailor Galaxia, who devote themselves to stealing Star Seeds, the essence of sentient life, from inhabitants of the Milky Way. Their ultimate goal is to reorganize the universe as desired by Chaos, the true main antagonist of the series.

Supporting characters

Luna, Artemis, and Diana
The series includes three different cat characters who act as advisors to their respective owners. Each has the power of speech, and bears a crescent moon symbol on his or her forehead. The two older cats, Luna and Artemis, lived in the Moon Kingdom, millennia before the main plot, and acted as advisors to Queen Serenity; the third, Diana, is much younger and was born on Earth. The cats serve as mentors and confidantes, and a source of information and new tools and special items. They are shown to have additional human forms, a deeper backstory, and an unrequited love or two. Although Luna takes the largest role of the three, Artemis was the first of the cats to appear; he figures prominently in Codename: Sailor V, the manga series which preceded Sailor Moon.

In Act 46 of the manga, the three are attacked by Sailor Tin Nyanko, a false Guardian from their home planet Mau (named after the Chinese word "貓", meaning "cat"). Artemis terms it a peace-loving world, but Tin Nyanko informs him that its people were wiped out by Sailor Galaxia after he and Luna left it. Tin Nyanko blasts all three of them on their crescent moon symbols, and they turn into ordinary cats, unable to speak. Later, as they care for the badly injured cats, Princess Kakyuu tells Usagi that the three of them have powerful Star Seeds, as brilliant as Sailor Crystals. In Act 48, they are brought to the River Lethe and killed by Sailor Lethe. They are reincarnated at the end of the series along with everyone else.

In the live-action series, Luna and Artemis are portrayed as stuffed toys rather than real cats. Usually they are represented by a puppet, though CGI effects are used for complicated scenes.

Writer Mary Grigsby considers the cat characters to blend pre-modern ideas about feminine mystery with modern ideas such as the lucky cat.

Luna

 is a black cat who is a devoted servant to Princess Serenity and advisor to her mother, Queen Serenity. When the kingdom falls, she and Artemis are put into a long sleep and sent to Earth to look after the Sailor Guardians, who are reborn there. Parts of Luna's memory are suppressed so that she must find the Sailor Guardians. She first encounters Usagi Tsukino and teaches her to become Sailor Moon, unaware that she is actually the reincarnated Princess Serenity. Luna also provides the Guardians with many of their special items. Over the course of the series, Luna develops a close bond with Usagi, though it is initially on uneasy terms, as Luna often upsets Usagi by giving her unsolicited advice. She and Artemis have an implied romantic relationship, which is confirmed when they meet Diana, who is their daughter from the future.

Artemis
 is the white cat companion to Minako Aino. Artemis trains her to become Sailor V, and remains by her side when she takes on her proper role as Sailor Venus. He first guides Usagi Tsukino through the Sailor V video game at the Crown Game Center arcade without revealing his true identity. In the anime, when a technical problem reveals him, Luna is greatly annoyed to learn that he has been the one guiding her all along. Later, he fills Luna in on the details of her true mission. In the Sailor V manga and the live-action series, Artemis gives special items to the Guardians, although unlike Luna he does not seem to produce them himself. He does not seem to mind the fact that he is named after a female goddess, even when teased about it by Minako. Artemis is more easy-going than Luna, and has a "big brother" relationship with Minako, although an attraction to her is sometimes implied. He also cares very deeply about Luna, often comforting her when she is distressed and stating his admiration of her. In addition, he is a good father to Diana, as evidenced by her affection for him.

Artemis is voiced by Yasuhiro Takato in the first anime adaptation. Yohei Oobayashi voiced him in the first three seasons of Crystal, while Taishi Murata took over for the Sailor Moon Eternal film. In the live-action series, he is voiced by Kappei Yamaguchi. He appears in the first Sailor Moon musical, played by a cat-suited Keiji Himeno. In the DIC/Cloverway English adaptation, he is voiced by Ron Rubin. In the Viz Media English adaptation, he is voiced by Johnny Yong Bosch.

Diana
 is the future daughter of Luna and Artemis. She first appears when the Sailor Guardians travel to the 30th century in the Black Moon arc. After defeating Death Phantom, the Sailor Guardians return to the 20th century and Diana joins them. In the anime, she first appears in Sailor Moon SuperS, calling Artemis her father, to Luna's initial dismay. Only later it is revealed that Diana has come from the future and that her mother is Luna. Just as Luna and Artemis guide Usagi and Minako, Diana acts as a guardian to Chibiusa. She is very curious, eager to help, and deeply polite, always addressing Usagi and Mamoru with the Japanese honorific  and calling Chibiusa by her formal title, Small Lady. She is able to help the Sailor Guardians on occasion, despite her youth, and often because of the knowledge she had gained in the future.

Diana is voiced by Kumiko Nishihara in the first series, and by Shoko Nakagawa in Crystal. In the Cloverway English adaptation, she is voiced by Loretta Jafelice in the series, and by Naomi Emmerson in Sailor Moon SuperS: The Movie. In the Viz Media English adaptation, she is voiced by Debi Derryberry.

In one of her reviews of Sailor Moon Crystal, IGN writer Meghan Sullivan admitted that the scene in which Diana tells Sailor Pluto to go and help Chibiusa and the Sailor Guardians while she guards the Door of Time and Space made her tear up, stating: "Here was this tiny cat - who by her own admission has no powers and is too small to fight, offering to help however she could. It's moments like these that remind me why I love Sailor Moon so much."

Sailor Starlights
The  are a group of Sailor Guardians composed of Sailor Star Fighter, Sailor Star Maker, and Sailor Star Healer; in civilian form they go by the pseudonyms Kou Seiya, Kou Taiki, and Kou Yaten, respectively. They come from the fictional planet , whose princess, Princess Kakyuu, left the planet to escape Sailor Galaxia's assault and to heal her wounds. The Starlights abandon Kinmoku and track Kakyuu to Earth and then Japan, where the Starlights disguise themselves as a male pop star group called  and embed their music with a telepathic broadcast in order to attract Kakyuu's attention. The Three Lights all attend Jūban High School along with Usagi and her friends. Eventually, on their way to the Galaxy Cauldron, they are killed by Galaxia's henchwomen Sailor Chi and Sailor Phi.

In the anime, the Starlights were given a major role. On Earth, the trio physically changed into males in their civilian forms, becoming women again when transforming into Sailor Guardians, as opposed to their manga counterparts that just disguise themselves as men in their civilian forms. As Starlights, they distance themselves from the other Sailor Guardians, deeming that Earth is not their responsibility. The Starlights survive several direct battles with Galaxia herself, and help Sailor Moon defeat Chaos to save Galaxia. Takeuchi expressed surprise at Toei Animation's decision to make the Starlights lead characters in the anime adaptation, but was even more shocked by their treatment of the Starlights' sex. In the Italian dub, instead of changing sex, there were six people – the Three Lights were always men, and simply summoned their twin sisters instead of transforming, as the original depiction was very controversial in Italy.

The Starlights are featured in several of the Sailor Moon musicals (Sailor Stars, Eien Densetsu, and their revised editions, plus Ryuusei Densetsu, Kakyuu-Ouhi Kourin and Le Mouvement Final). While played by women, it is meant to be ambiguous as to whether they take on male forms or cross-dress, though their personalities reflect the former. Their story also combines elements from both the manga and the anime; for instance, they travel to the Galaxy Cauldron as they do in the manga, but survive the battles against Galaxia as they do in the anime. The pairings with the Sailor Guardians from the anime are also featured in some musicals.

Their exact relationship to each other is unknown; according to the manga they are not siblings. Their name "Kou" (光) translates to "light", among other things, making the name "Three Lights" a pun. In the original English manga, "Kou" was translated to "Lights" and was used as their shared family name.

Sailor Star Fighter
In general, Seiya acts arrogant and tends to be, at least on the surface, confident in their own abilities.

Seiya becomes the star player of their local high-school American football team and the school's star athlete, upsetting Haruka Tenoh, who was the school's previous star athlete on the track and field team. Eventually, Seiya raises the suspicions of the Sailor Guardians as to their identity. In the anime, Taiki and Yaten consider them prone to bouts of childishness (such as when they show off their basketball skills in front of the school), but generally follow their lead.

Seiya develops strong feelings for Usagi; his attempts to forge a bond with her provide the primary romantic tension of the season. Seiya calls Usagi odango, like Mamoru does. The two go on a date at an amusement park, which is interrupted when Sailor Iron Mouse attacks. Seiya makes their interest in her clear when they spend time together practicing softball, telling her, "I like your light." However, Seiya's feelings are not reciprocated and they acknowledge the one-sided romance.

The relationship between Sailor Star Fighter and Princess Kakyuu is slightly ambiguous. In the anime, when Seiya daydreams of their home planet, they think lovingly of an image of their princess, which is suddenly superimposed by an image of Usagi, much as Usagi had seen Seiya's image overlaid by Mamoru in previous episodes. In the image poem released for their CD single, however, they suggest that their feelings for her are because they are "carrying the heart of a boy" and because they were attracted to her light.

Seiya's responsibilities in the band are lead vocals, guitar, and lyrics. They were once seen in the anime angrily playing the drums in their hideout because they think their princess has not heard them yet. According to Takeuchi, when she created this character it was meant to be a combination between Haruka and Mamoru, and was modeled after Jenny Shimizu.

In the original Japanese version of the anime series, they were voiced by Shiho Niiyama in one of her final roles before her death, and in the Cosmos film Seiya is voiced by Marina Inoue. In English, their voice is provided by Melissa Hutchison. In the musicals, Seiya has been portrayed by Sayuri Katayama, Chinatsu Akiyama and Meiku Harukawa.

Sailor Star Maker
Their abilities rival that of Ami Mizuno, though they consider her romantic notions foolish. In the anime, Ami's appeal for them to see the good in dreaming does begin to have an effect, however. In combat with a phage, Star Maker is the first of the Starlights to willingly allow Sailor Moon to heal the monster rather than trying to kill it themselves, because it had been a teacher who Ami respected. Later in the series, as they are beginning to lose hope in finding Princess Kakyuu, they visit a sick girl named Misa in the hospital. She shows them a drawing of the Princess that she sees when she listens to the Three Lights' song. With renewed hope, Taiki returns to the Three Lights.

Like Yaten, Taiki believes that Seiya should stay away from Usagi after learning she is Sailor Moon, despite their wish, shared by Princess Kakyuu and the Sailor Guardians, for them all to work together. However, their views on Usagi change for the better near the end of Sailor Stars. They are the most cool-headed of the trio.

Taiki's responsibilities in the band are background vocals, keyboards, and composition. They also enjoy poetry and belongs to the literature club at school. Taiki is meant to be a more-distant Setsuna Meioh.

In the original Japanese version of the anime series, Taiki were voiced by Narumi Tsunoda, and in the Cosmos film Taiki is voiced by Saori Hayami. In English their voice is provided by Erika Harlacher. In the musicals, Taiki has been portrayed by Hikari Ono, Akiko Nakayama, and Riona Tatemichi.

Sailor Star Healer
Their remarks are often sharp-edged and blunt, which further separates them from the world. At one point, the other Starlights even chastise Yaten for behaving in a way that might reduce the number of fans. Yaten does not interact with the people around them much, wanting to focus on the mission. Yaten is egotistical and nurses grudges, and hates injury. However, they and Luna get along well.

Yaten has the most spiritual awareness of the Starlights, and is able to tell when Star Seeds are taken by Galaxia. They view humans as untrustworthy and wants to find Princess Kakyuu so they can leave Earth as quickly as possible. When they discover that Usagi is Sailor Moon, Yaten believes that Seiya should stay away from Usagi, despite their wish, shared by Princess Kakyuu and the Sailor Guardians, for them all to work together. Their view is shared by Taiki as well as Sailors Uranus, Neptune, and Pluto. However, also like Taiki, their views on Usagi change for the better near the end of Sailor Stars. In the anime, Yaten is shown to be physically stronger than Makoto Kino in their civilian forms. Yaten is also said to bond with Minako Aino, due to some parts in the series where they share some moments together.

Yaten's responsibilities in the band are background vocals, bass guitar, and song arrangement. They also enjoy photography but does not belong to any school club, preferring to just go home.

In the original Japanese version of the anime series, Yaten was voiced by Chika Sakamoto, and in the Cosmos film Yaten is voiced by Ayane Sakura. In English, their voice is provided by Sarah Anne Williams. In the musicals, Yaten has been portrayed by Momoko Okuyama, Mikako Tabe, and Saki Matsuda.

Other humans

Ikuko Tsukino
 is the mother of Usagi. She is often seen cooking and lecturing Usagi for her grades in school. They are shown to be close, since she gives Usagi advice on relationships of all kinds, and eagerly accepts her relationship with Mamoru. She cares for Chibiusa when she is present, whom she believes to be her niece, but who in truth is her future granddaughter. She also cares for Chibi-Chibi, whom she believes to be her second daughter. Ikuko's name and design are modeled after Takeuchi's mother.

In the live-action series, Ikuko is portrayed as an extremely outgoing, quirky, and determined person. She changes her hairstyle almost every day, is constantly trying out new (and questionable) omelette recipes, and loves nothing more than being in the spotlight. She is a high-school friend with Minako's manager, and it is said the two of them were big participants in their school's theater program.

In the original Japanese series, Ikuko is voiced by Sanae Takagi in the first anime and by Yūko Mizutani in Crystal until her death in 2016. In the DIC and Cloverway English dubs, she is voiced by Barbara Radecki. In the Viz Media English dub, her voice is supplied by Tara Platt. Kaori Moriwaka portrays Ikuko in the live-action series.

Kenji Tsukino
 is Usagi's father, a stereotypical well-meaning Japanese salaryman, who works as a magazine reporter and later as an editor-in-chief. Kenji is quite affectionate with his wife. Early on, he becomes jealous when he sees Usagi with Mamoru Chiba, thinking he is too old for her. Like his wife, Kenji is entirely unaware of Usagi's real identity. He senses a maturity in his daughter when she is finally aware of her status as Princess Serenity, and notes that at times her beauty seems serene. Kenji appears less frequently after the anime adaptation's second season.

In the live-action series, he never appears in the main body of the series, which is explained by his always being away on business trips. He appears briefly in the direct-to-DVD Special Act, crying at Usagi's wedding.

In the anime series, Kenji is voiced by Yuji Machi in the first series and by Mitsuaki Madono in Crystal. In the DIC/Cloverway English adaptation, he is voiced by David Huband. In the Viz Media English adaptation, he is voiced by Keith Silverstein. In the Special Act of the live-action series, he is portrayed by series director Ryuta Tasaki.

Shingo Tsukino
 is the younger brother of Usagi, making her the only Sailor Guardian with a known sibling. His influence in her life is alternately helpful and mocking; he considers her well-meaning, but also considers her an accident-prone crybaby. He generally does not get along with Usagi very well; however, the two siblings deeply care and love each other. Though unaware of his sister's true identity, Shingo is impressed by the media-hyped urban legends of Sailor Moon and Sailor V. He is a particularly enthusiastic fan of Sailor Moon because she rescued him from Dark Kingdom forces early in her career. Like his older sister, he enjoys video games and, unlike his sister, is a diligent student. Shingo's favorite book is Shonen J*mp   (a reference to the manga anthology Weekly Shōnen Jump). In the anime, Shingo appears in several episodes of the first season, but is less frequently seen afterwards.

In the live-action series, Shingo dislikes much of what his sister and mother do, and does not care about much of life in general. In the video game Sailor Moon: Another Story, Shingo is kidnapped by the villains in an attempt to force Usagi to hand over the Silver Crystal.

In the original Japanese series, Shingo was voiced by Chiyoko Kawashima until her retirement in 2001, with Seira Ryū taking over the role afterward in Crystal. In the DIC/Cloverway English adaptation, he is voiced by Julie Lemieux. In the Viz Media English adaptation, his voice is supplied by Nicolas Roye. In the live-action series, he is portrayed by Naoki Takeshi.

Naru Osaka
 is Usagi's best friend and schoolmate at the start of the series. Naru and her mother are the very first victims of a monster attack, and Naru hero-worships Sailor Moon for saving them. Throughout the series she continues to be a frequent target of villains and monsters. In a "memorable subplot" of the anime adaptation, Naru falls in love with Nephrite, who eventually returns her feelings and attempts to atone for his misdeeds. His death while protecting Naru devastates her throughout the first season. Voice actress Kotono Mitsuishi was particularly touched by this sequence. In the anime, Naru later dates Gurio Umino.

Naru plays a much more important role in the live-action series, learning most of the truth about the Sailor Guardians. She is also a more confident and outgoing person. For a short while, she and Ami share a conflicted relationship as both seem to be jealous of the other's closeness with Usagi. However, they resolve their differences and become good friends.

Naru's younger sister, Naruru, features in a short side-story in the Stars manga. In the anime it is stated that she is an only child. Naruru at first appears with Haruka, Michiru, and Usagi at the high school and is shown getting along with them.

Naru is voiced by Shino Kakinuma in the original series and by Satomi Satō in Crystal. In the DIC/Cloverway English versions, she is voiced by Mary Long in a heavy Brooklyn accent. In the Viz Media English version, she is voiced by Danielle Judovits. Chieko Ochi portrays her in the live-action series. In the musical Pretty Guardian Sailor Moon - Nogizaka46 Version, Naru is portrayed by Yuka Yamauchi.

Gurio Umino
 is a student in Usagi's class at school. He is usually called simply Umino, and begins with a severe infatuation with Usagi. His defining characteristic is his glasses, which are drawn with swirls denoting their thickness. Umino is commonly portrayed as a "nerdy", "weird", and "know-it-all" otaku, regularly keeping Usagi informed on current events, new students, gossip, and any other information she might appreciate. Despite his ordinarily nerdy appearance, Umino is implied (and later confirmed by Takeuchi) to be "relatively handsome" with his glasses off. In the first anime, he develops a relationship with Naru, but their importance gradually decreases after the first anime season.

The kanji in Umino's surname represent a pun meaning either "ocean field" or "of ocean"; as such, it is constructed in the same way as Usagi's and those of other Sailor Guardians.

In the Japanese series, his voice actor is Keiichi Nanba in Sailor Moon and Daiki Yamashita in Crystal. In the DIC/Cloverway English adaptation, he is voiced by Roland Parliament. In the Viz Media English adaptation, his voice is supplied by Ben Diskin. In the musical Pretty Guardian Sailor Moon - Nogizaka46 Version, Umino is portrayed by Marina Tanoue.

Haruna Sakurada
 is a junior high school teacher who often lectures Usagi for her laziness. Haruna intends to find a husband, which makes her an easy target for the Dark Kingdom during the first arc, and she often engages in seemingly childish things in this regard. She appears less frequently as the series progresses, and is never seen after Usagi and her friends start high school. In the live-action series, Haruna assigns pop quizzes and clean-up duty when needed. She has an extremely eccentric personality, and is very friendly and motherly towards her students, even Usagi.

The kanji in her name mean "cherry blossom" (sakura), "rice field" (da), "spring" (haru), and "vegetables" (na). The "spring" part of her name becomes a pun in the context of other works by Takeuchi: Haruna appears very briefly in one earlier series, The Cherry Project, which features her sister Fuyuna in one of its side stories. Two other characters with similar names appear in Takeuchi works: Natsuna in Codename: Sailor V and Akina in PQ Angels, both of which also have the Sakurada surname. The Japanese words fuyu, natsu, and aki mean "winter", "summer", and "autumn", respectively.

In the Japanese series, Haruna was originally voiced by Chiyoko Kawashima in Sailor Moon until her retirement in 2001. Akemi Kanda voices her from Crystal onwards. In the DIC English adaptation, she is voiced by Nadine Rabinovitch. In the Viz Media English adaptation, her voice is supplied by Julie Ann Taylor. She is played by Tomoko Otakara in the live-action series. In the musicals, Haruna is portrayed at various points by Kasumi Hyuga and Kiho Seishi.

Motoki Furuhata
 works at the Crown Game Center, a video arcade Usagi frequently visits. Motoki also holds a job at the Crown Fruit Parlor and is a KO University student along with Mamoru Chiba. After he recognizes the Sailor Guardians and learns their true identities, Motoki vows not to tell anyone. In the anime adaptation, Usagi calls him  and has a crush on him in the beginning of the series. Motoki and Mamoru also attend the Azabu Institute of Technology. He is pretty naive, and says that he views the girls as younger sisters, oblivious to the fact that they have crushes on him. He has a little sister, Unazuki Furuhata, who is friends with Usagi and the others. His girlfriend is Reika Nishimura, a science student. It is gradually revealed that he and Reika knew Setsuna while she was studying at their university. In the continuity of Sailor Moon Crystal, Motoki's background is the same, but he does not know Mamoru, who is still a high school student.

In the live-action series, the Crown Center is a karaoke parlor. There is an initial recurring flirtatious relationship between Motoki and Makoto until it becomes a bit more serious, and in the Special Act, which takes place four years after the series finale, Motoki proposes to Makoto, who accepts.

In the Japanese series, Motoki is voiced by Hiroyuki Satō in Sailor Moon and by Hiroshi Okamoto in Crystal. In the DIC English adaptation, he is voiced by Colin O'Meara, in the Cloverway dub by Steven Bednarski. In the Viz Media English adaptation, his voice is supplied by Lucien Dodge. Motoki is portrayed by Masaya Kikawada in the live-action series.

Reika Nishimura
 is Motoki Furuhata's girlfriend and fellow student at KO University. She later befriends Setsuna Meioh there. In the anime, she is the reincarnation of the Great Monster Rikokeidā. After leaving Japan twice to study abroad, she eventually leaves the country for 10 years, but Motoki is still willing to wait for her. She is voiced by Rika Fukami in the original series and by Mai Nakahara in Crystal. In the DIC English adaptation, Reika was voiced by Wendy Lyon and Lindsay Collins, while Sara Sahr voiced her in the Cloverway dub. In the Viz Media English adaptation, she is voiced by Erica Mendez.

Rei's grandfather
 is a Shinto priest and grandfather of Rei Hino who lives at the Hikawa Shrine. In the anime, he has a different physical appearance and plays a more-prominent role as one of the holders of the Rainbow Crystals that make up the Silver Crystal. He often flirts with anyone regardless of gender. In the first anime adaptation, he is voiced by Tomomichi Nishimura, while Hirohiko Kakegawa voices him in Sailor Moon Eternal. In the DIC/Cloverway English adaptation, he is voiced by David Fraser, except in Sailor Moon S episode 99 where he was voiced by John Stocker as a stand-in. In the Viz Media English adaptation of the first anime adaptation, his voice is supplied by Michael Sorich, while Todd Haberkorn voices the character in Sailor Moon Eternal.

Yuichiro Kumada
 is an anime-only character appearing as a ragged-looking young man who helps out at the Hikawa Shrine. His family is very rich and has a mountain lodge, where he takes Rei and her friends for skiing. After falling in love with Rei, Yūichirō decides to stay at Hikawa Shrine in order to be near her. Even though she does not reciprocate his love, he remains faithful and tries to protect her. She warms up to his personality considerably over time. In the first Japanese anime series, Yūichirō is voiced by Bin Shimada. In the DIC/Cloverway English adaptation, he is voiced by Steven Bednarski, Damon D'Oliveira (Sailor Moon S), and Jason Barr (Sailor Moon SuperS). In the Viz Media English adaption, he is voiced by Wally Wingert.

Unazuki Furuhata
 is the younger sister of Motoki Furuhata, who works as a waitress at the Crown Fruit Parlor, where the Sailor Guardians spend much of their free time in the latter parts of the anime. Unazuki attends T•A Private Girls School with Rei Hino. She first appears sporadically, with her initial appearance in Sailor Moon R as a mistaken love rival for Mamoru Chiba. She dreams of her first kiss in Sailor Moon S, which results in being targeted by the Death Busters. Unazuki appears more frequently in SuperS as a major supporting character and is usually among Usagi's group. She is voiced by Miyako Endou in the first series, with Eriko Hara as a stand-in. In the DIC English adaptation, she is voiced by Sabrina Grdevich and in the Cloverway dub by Catherine Disher in Sailor Moon S and Daniela Olivieri in SuperS. In the Viz Media English adaptation, she is voiced by Veronica Taylor.

Kotono Sarashina
 is a student at T•A Academy for Girls, and the president of the school's Supernatural Research Club. Like many of the students at T•A, she seemed to have an admiration for Rei Hino. She first appeared in Act 15, when the disguised Koan created a rival club with a fortune-telling booth at the school festival. Kotono is also Kyusuke Sarashina's elder sister, and made a Sailor V button for her brother. Chibiusa liked it but Kyusuke refused to get her one, but after the two of them helped defeat the vampire Lilica Hubert, he had Kotono make a Sailor Moon button for her as well. She is voiced by Akemi Kanda in Sailor Moon Crystal and by Tara Sands in the Viz Media English dub.

Ittou Asanuma
 is introduced in the Black Moon arc of the manga as Makoto's friend. He is interested in science fiction, UFOs and the paranormal activity that occurs in the area. He greatly respects Mamoru, who is an upperclassman at his school. Asanuma initially thinks that the Sailor Guardians are aliens. However, after he sees Luna talk, Makoto confesses the Guardians' identities to him. Asanuma is later attacked by Ayakashi sister Calaveras and rescued by Sailor Moon. At the beginning of the Infinity arc he appears with Mamoru and Chibiusa in an amusement park, and in the Stars arc he gives Mamoru's phone number to Usagi when she is unable to locate him. Asanuma is briefly seen in the anime, looking for Mamoru when the latter is controlled by Queen Nehelenia. He is voiced by Kazuya Nakai in the original series and by Daisuke Sakaguchi in Crystal. In the Viz Media English dub, he is voiced by Greg Felden.

Momoko Momohara
 appears as an elementary-school student who befriends Chibiusa. In the anime, she is badly injured in a fight with Chiral and Achiral, two Black Moon members, causing Chibiusa to go into a fit and unleash her latent powers at the monsters. Later, Momoko becomes the first target of the Amazoness Quartet, but is saved by Sailor Chibi Moon and Sailor Moon. She is voiced by Taeko Kawata. In the DIC/Cloverway English adaptation, her name is changed to Melissa and later Melanie, and her voice is supplied by Mary Long and Tanya Donato at various points. In the Viz Media English adaptation, she is voiced by Debi Derryberry.

Kyusuke Sarashina
 attends elementary school with Chibiusa and Momoko. He is the younger brother of Kotono, who goes to school with Rei. He is known to be very athletic and sarcastic. Kyūsuke makes recurring appearances in Sailor Moon SuperS, and is targeted by Amazoness JunJun in episode 155. He appears in a later episode, when Chibiusa befriends a boy named Hiroki, who is trying to build a flying machine. While Kyūsuke is initially resentful of Hiroki and how impressed Chibiusa is with Hiroki's dream, Kyūsuke encourages Hiroki continue building the flying machine after multiple failed attempts. In the first anime adaptation, he is voiced by Kazumi Okushima in his initial appearance, and by Daisuke Sakaguchi in all subsequent appearances, while Yukiko Morishita voices him in Crystal. In the DIC/Cloverway English adaptation, his name is changed to Kelly, and he is voiced by Nicola St. John. In the Viz English dub, Kyusuke is voiced by Kyle Hebert.

Other nonhumans

Queen Serenity
 is the mother of Sailor Moon in her past life as Princess Serenity. As the Queen regnant of the Moon, she reigned during the first Silver Millennium era. She states that the ancient Earth civilizations have known her as the moon goddess, Selene. When the Dark Kingdom attacks the Moon Kingdom, she sacrifices herself by using the Silver Crystal to seal Queen Metaria and to have her daughter, Endymion and the Sailor Guardians be reborn on Earth. Queen Serenity first appears as a hologram, having saved her spirit within a computer in order to preserve her will. She tells the five Sailor Guardians of their past lives, which they begin to remember as she describes them, and tells them that they must find Queen Metaria, who had eventually escaped the thousand-year-old seal placed on her and gone into hiding on Earth. Afterwards, she only appears in flashbacks as cameos.

In the thirteen-episode separate arc of Sailor Moon R preceding the Black Moon saga, a vision of Queen Serenity gives Usagi her second transformation brooch, the Crystal Star and the mystical Cutie Moon Rod as her new weapon in pacifying any enemy. She also appears in the forty-episode live-action series's special episode, "We're Getting Married!", that had also adapted the Dark Kingdom saga.

She is voiced by Mika Doi in the first anime series, with Mami Koyama taking over the role for the 2014 reboot Sailor Moon Crystal. In the Cloverway English adaptation, she is voiced by Barbara Radecki in the premiere, and later by Wendy Lyon. In the Viz Media English adaptation, she is voiced by Wendee Lee. In the live-action series, Miyu Sawai portrays Queen Serenity, with her voice dubbed over by Yōko Sōmi.

Phobos and Deimos
They have the ability to sense evil, and sometimes attack enemies. It is revealed that when Rei was a child, they "told" her their names. Eventually, they reveal themselves as the Power Guardians – small humanoid sprites charged with guarding Sailor Mars. They save Sailor Mars from being killed by the Tiger's Eye and give a Sailor Crystal to her. They are later revealed to be from the planet Coronis when they encounter Sailor Lead Crow, who is also from Coronis. Lead Crow steals Phobos and Deimos' Star Seeds, killing them. The two of them have Star Seeds on a level near or equal to a Sailor Crystal.

Phobos and Deimos are voiced by Kanami Taguchi and Aya Yamane respectively in Sailor Moon Eternal. In Viz English Dub of Sailor Moon Eternal, Deimos is voiced by Kelly Baskin.

In the live-action series, Rei's crows appear only in the third episode. In the Another Story video game, they go with her on the search for Jadeite's stone. A fake Deimos and Phobos appear in crow form in the musical Sailor Moon S – Usagi – Ai no Senshi e no Michi. They were portrayed by male actors in animal costumes.

Helios/Pegasus
 is the Guardian Priest (high priest and guardian) of Elysion, a sacred land within Earth that protects it while also being the original site of the Golden Kingdom before it took to the surface. When Elysion is conquered by the Dead Moon Circus, Helios is encaged while transformed by Queen Nelehenia into an alicorn called . Helios remembered a vision of maiden who would save Elysion, astral projecting his Pegasus form to the surface where he assumed Chibiusa to be that maiden while providing her and Usagi with information and new weapons. He becomes close to Chibiusa despite her insistence that Usagi is the maiden he seeks, eventually revealing his true from and that Endymion's condition this connected to the curse Nehelenia inflicted on Elysion. After being revived by Chibiusa after sacrificing himself to give the Sailor Guardians a fighting chance against Zirconia, Helios returns the group to the surface and promises Chibiusa they would meet again.

In Sailor Moon SuperS, Helios guards the Golden Crystal that protects the sweet and beautiful dreams of Earth's people, as well as drawing more power and strength from those dreams. Nehelenia attacks him because she wants the Crystal for herself, so Helios leaves his own body to flee with the Crystal. Taking on the form of the mythical Pegasus, he places the Crystal on his forehead as a horn and hides in Chibiusa's dreams. There, he asks for her help and grants power to her and to her allies using several special items. Though he does not trust Chibiusa at first, they gradually develop a connection, and in the end he tells her his secrets by revealing his world of Elysion as well as his true form and name.

In the anime series, he is voiced by Taiki Matsuno in Sailor Moon, while Yoshitsugu Matsuoka voices him in Sailor Moon Eternal. In the Cloverway English adaptation, he is voiced by Rowan Tichenor and in the Viz Media English adaptation, he is voiced by Chris Niosi. In the English dub of Sailor Moon Eternal, he is voiced by Brian Beacock. In the musicals, Pegasus is voiced by Yuta Enomoto.

Takeuchi stated that she was dissatisfied with Helios' clothing design, having created his outfit in a hurry because it was easy to draw and she was pressed for time. She describes the result as "ugly" and "a disaster", commenting that the character inherited his "irresponsible ways" from herself.

They escaped the Dead Moon Circus's curse by falling asleep. The Maenads eventually awake and guide Chibiusa to Helios, and later appear along with the main characters after Nehelenia's defeat. In Eternal, they are voiced by Ruriko Noguchi and Yūki Hirose.

Princess Kakyuu
 is the princess of Kinmoku (which is named for kinmokusei, the Japanese name for the Osmanthus fragrans (the Sweet Osmanthus) fruiting plant), a fictional planet outside of the Solar System that is also the home of the Sailor Starlights, who are Kakyuu's protectors and spend much of the story searching for her. Kinmoku is attacked and destroyed by Sailor Galaxia, while Kakyuu is injured during the battle. She cannot reveal herself until her wounds are healed, and the Starlights lose contact with her. She travels to Earth because she senses the birth of the Silver Crystal, and hides in a censer that is guarded by Chibi-Chibi. She has her own Guardian form, Sailor Kakyuu, and later reveals to Sailor Moon that her own lover had died in the war against Galaxia. Kakyuu eventually reunites with the Starlights and accompanies Sailor Moon to Zero Star Sagittarius to confront Galaxia, but is mortally wounded by Sailor Chi. She dies in Sailor Moon's arms, saying that she wants to be reborn, maybe in a world without war, but at the very least to be with everyone again. In the manga, Kakyuu had a lover who was killed by Galaxia.

In the anime adaptation, Kakyuu goes to Earth to locate the "Light of Hope" and to hide from Galaxia. During her time under Chibi-Chibi's care, she is aware of the Starlights searching for her, but cannot reveal herself too soon. She eventually saves Sailor Moon and the others from a black hole and resumes leadership of the Starlights. However, after Kakyuu is found, Galaxia steals her Star Seed, killing her. After Sailor Moon defeats Chaos, Kakyuu is revived. She and the Starlights return to Kinmoku to rebuild and start over. Her Sailor Guardian form is never shown in this adaptation.

In the original Japanese series, her voice actress is Sakiko Tamagawa, and in the Cosmos film her voice actress is Nana Mizuki. In the English dub, she is voiced by Allegra Clark. In the musical version, Princess Kakyuu is portrayed by Sakoto Yoshioka, Ai Toyama, and Asami Okamura.

Chibi-Chibi
 first appears in Act 44 of the manga and episode 182 of the anime. She appears to be a very young child and imitates the ends of others' sentences, mostly saying "chibi". Her red-pink hair is always up in two heart shaped odango with little ringlets sticking out the sides, echoing Usagi's hairstyle. Chibi-Chibi's name is a doubling of the Japanese term meaning "small person" or "small child" and is used both for that reason and because of Chibi-Chibi's similarity to Chibiusa. It is also a pun, as the word Chibi-Chibi means "making something last".

Chibi-Chibi is first shown floating down to Earth with an umbrella in her hand and shows up at the Tsukino house. In the anime, she first meets Usagi in the park one afternoon and starts to follow her around, saying only "chibi chibi" without having been prompted. Chibi-Chibi attaches herself to Usagi's family, whose memories are modified so that they believe her to be the youngest child of the family – almost exactly what Chibiusa had done on her first appearance. Chibi-Chibi is the caretaker of a small ornate censer in which Princess Kakyuu is resting, hidden from Sailor Galaxia. Chibi-Chibi eventually transforms, under her own power, into a Sailor Guardian called Sailor Chibi-Chibi. In her Sailor Guardian form, she carries a heart scepter and uses it to defend herself and Sailor Moon, but is not shown using any attack of her own. Chibi-Chibi's childlike form is a disguise for Sailor Cosmos, a powerful Sailor Guardian who is the future version of Sailor Moon.

In the anime, Chibi-Chibi is Galaxia's Star Seed, who had once been a great force for good. When Galaxia fought Chaos, she could see no way to defeat it except to seal it away inside her own body. In order to protect her Star Seed from being corrupted, she sent it away to Earth, where it became Chibi-Chibi. Chibi-Chibi is referred to as the "light of hope" (kibō no hikari) by the Starlights; their one chance for defeating Galaxia. In the end, Chibi-Chibi transforms herself into the Sword of Sealing (fuuin no ken), the weapon Galaxia had used to seal away Chaos, and Chibi-Chibi begs Sailor Moon to use it to defeat them. During the battle, Galaxia shatters the sword, killing Chibi-Chibi. However, Chibi-Chibi is revived along with all the other fallen Sailor Guardians after Sailor Moon cleanses Galaxia of Chaos.

In the anime series, Chibi-Chibi is voiced by Kotono Mitsuishi in Japanese, and by Stephanie Sheh in English. In the Cosmos film, her voice actress is Kotono Mitsuishi as well. In the stage musicals, Chibi-Chibi has been played by Mao Kawasaki, Mikiko Asuke, Yuka Gouchou, and Mina Horita. Takeuchi praised Kawasaki's cuteness as Chibi-Chibi. When she appears in the stage musicals, Chibi-Chibi's backstory always follows the anime version. She is given her own song, "Mou ii no", which she sings to announce that she has come to rejoin Galaxia.

Sailor Cosmos
 is the ultimate future form of Sailor Moon. She comes from a future which has been destroyed by the battle with Sailor Chaos; after ages of fighting, she despairs and flees to the past as the infant Chibi-Chibi to encourage Sailor Moon to defeat Chaos in the final battle of the series. At first, she wants Sailor Moon to destroy the Galaxy Cauldron altogether, ensuring Chaos' destruction, but Sailor Moon protests, realizing that if the Cauldron is destroyed no more stars will be born, leaving the Galaxy without a future. Sailor Moon chooses to sacrifice herself to the Cauldron and seal Chaos away, which Cosmos realizes to have been the right decision. Reminded of the strength and courage she herself needs to have, Sailor Cosmos returns to the future with new hope. After the end of the anime adaptation, Takeuchi commented that she wished Sailor Cosmos had been used in Sailor Moon Sailor Stars. In the musicals, Sailor Cosmos is played by Satomi Okubo, who played Usagi Tsukino/Sailor Moon between 2013 and 2015.

Merchandise
Differences in character between the Sailor Guardians mirror differences in their hairstyles, fashion, and magical items, which has translated well into doll lines. Sales of the Sailor Guardians fashion dolls overtook those of Licca-chan in the 1990s. Mattel attributed this to the "fashion-action" blend of the Sailor Moon storyline; doll accessories included both fashion items and the Guardian's weapons. The first line of dolls included Queen Beryl, the first major antagonist of the series, a decision that was described as a "radical idea". Bandai introduced a line of little dolls that included the Amazoness Quartet and, according to Takeuchi, these were their favorite because "with their costumes and faithfulness to the originals, the dolls really excelled." Bandai has released several S.H. Figuarts based on the characters' appearances from the first anime adaptation. Among those figures are the Sailor Guardians, Tuxedo Mask, and Black Lady. In early 2014, Megahouse released a set of trading figures consisting of twelve figurines, two for each Sailor Guardian and two for Tuxedo Mask.

Several characters, including Sailor Guardians, villains, supporting characters, and monsters of the day are featured in a collectible card game which was released in 2000 by Dart Flipcards. A collaboration between Sailor Moon and Capcom took place in March 2018 as part of the 25th anniversary celebration of the Sailor Moon franchise. In this collaboration, the Felyne cat companion resembles Luna and wields Usagi's Cutie Moon Rod weapon in the Monster Hunter XX expansion of Monster Hunter Generations.

Reception

Sailor Moon has been described largely in terms of its characters; a sustained 18-volume narrative about a group of young heroines who are simultaneously heroic and introspective, active and emotional, dutiful and ambitious. The combination proved extremely successful, and Sailor Moon became internationally popular in both manga and anime formats.

The function of the Sailor Guardians themselves has been analyzed by critics, often in terms of feminist theory. Susan J. Napier described the Sailor Guardians as "powerful, yet childlike", and suggested that this is because Sailor Moon is aimed towards an audience of young girls. She stated that the Sailor Guardians readily accept their powers and destinies and do not agonize over them, which can be read as an expression of power and success. The Sailor Guardians have been described as merging male and female traits, being both desirable and powerful. As sexualized teen heroines, they are significantly different from the sexless representation of 1980s teen heroines such as Nausicaä. Anne Allison noted that the use of the sailor fuku as a costume makes it easy for girls to identify with the Sailor Guardians, but also for older males to see them as sex symbols. Unlike the female Power Rangers, who as the series go on become more unisex in both costume and poses, the Sailor Guardians' costumes become frillier and more "feminine".

Mary Grigsby considered that the Sailor Guardians blend ancient characteristics and symbols of femininity with modern ideas, reminding the audience of a pre-modern time when females were equal to males, but other critics drew parallels with the modern character type of the aggressive cyborg woman, pointing out that the Sailor Guardians are augmented by their magical equipment. Much of the Sailor Guardians' strength stems from their reliance and friendship with other girls rather than from men.

Kazuko Minomiya has described the daily lives of the girls within the series as risoukyou, or "utopic". They are shown as enjoying many leisure activities such as shopping, visiting amusement parks, and hanging out at the Crown Arcade. According to Allison, Minomiya points out that the depiction of life is harder and more serious for male superheroes. The characters "double" as ordinary girls and as "celestially-empowered superheroes". The "highly stylized" transformation that the Sailor Guardians go through has been said to "symbolically separate" the negative aspects of the characters (laziness, for example) and the positive aspects of the superheroine, and gives each girl her unique uniform and "a set of individual powers". Some commentators have read the transformation of the Sailor Guardians as symbolic of puberty, as cosmetics appear on the Guardians and their uniforms highlight cleavages, slim waists, and long legs, which "outright force the pun on heavenly bodies".

Jason Thompson found the Sailor Moon anime reinvigorated the magical girl genre by adding dynamic heroines and action-oriented plots. Following its success, similar series, such Magic Knight Rayearth, Wedding Peach, Nurse Angel Ririka SOS, Revolutionary Girl Utena, Fushigi Yuugi and Pretty Cure, emerged.

Notes

References

Further reading
Takeuchi, Naoko. 美少女戦士セーラームーン Pretty Guardian Sailor Moon (in Japanese). 18 vols. Tokyo: Kodansha, 1992–1997.
Takeuchi, Naoko. Pretty Guardian Sailor Moon. 12 vols. New York City: Kodansha USA, 2011–2013.

External links

Lists of anime and manga characters
Lists of fictional Japanese characters
 
Characters

pt:Sailor Moon#Personagens